Kraken Titan Tribute is the name of a studio album tribute to Colombian group Kraken.  It was released on 2 April 2004 by Ethnicity Records.

Information 
This album comprises fifteen songs from every album of Kraken's discography. Various Colombian bands contributed the covers.

Track listing

References 

Kraken (band) albums
2007 albums